Henry Parrington (7 October 1848 – 1926) was a New Zealand cricketer. He played in three first-class matches for Wellington from 1875 to 1883.

See also
 List of Wellington representative cricketers

References

External links
 

1848 births
1926 deaths
New Zealand cricketers
Wellington cricketers
People from Thetford
West Coast cricketers